Ryan Cretens (born January 8, 1996) is an American professional soccer player.

Career

Youth 
Cretens played for the North Carolina FC Youth Academy. He also played two seasons for Wake Forest-Rolesville High School.

College 
Cretens played college soccer at UNC Wilmington, appearing in 57 games and posting at 0.716 save percentage. As a redshirt senior in 2018, he was named to the second team for the Colonial Athletic Association.

Professional

Carolina Dynamo
Cretens played for the Carolina Dynamo of the Premier Development League from 2015 to 2017. In 2016, he was PDL Goalkeeper of the Year, recording five clean sheets and a 0.33 goals against average.

Cretens played in the Dynamo's second-round game during the 2017 U.S. Open Cup, a 6-1 loss to North Carolina FC.

Tobacco Road FC
In 2018, Cretens joined Tobacco Road FC.

North Carolina FC
On August 24, 2019, Cretens was signed by North Carolina FC of the USL Championship.

References

External links 
 

1996 births
Living people
American soccer players
Association football goalkeepers
North Carolina Fusion U23 players
North Carolina FC players
Soccer players from North Carolina
Soccer players from San Jose, California
People from Zebulon, North Carolina
Tobacco Road FC players
UNC Wilmington Seahawks men's soccer players
USL League Two players
USL Championship players